Sirukoodalpatti is a village located in Sivaganga district of southern Tamil Nadu state, India.
It is part of Chettinad region located about seven kilometers away from Karaikudi and four kilometers from Pillayarpatti (via Alagiya Devi Temple).  The poet Kannadasan and writer, director, producer and lyricist Panchu Arunachalam were both born in Sirukoodalpatti.

References

Villages in Sivaganga district